Jüri Käo (born 16 November 1965 in Tallinn) is one of the managers and shareholders at NG Investeeringud, which is an industry, retail trade and real estate investment group based on Estonian private capital and employs more than 4300 people.

In 2009 the Äripäev business newspaper named Jüri Käo businessman of the year, earlier he has been named the most influential businessman in Estonia (in 2006 and 2007).

In 2001 the president of Estonia awarded Jüri Käo the Order of the White Star, 4th class and in 2006 the Order of the White Star, 2nd class for promoting business and contributing to Estonia becoming a member of the EU.

From 2016 Jüri Käo is the vice president of the Estonian Employers Confederation council. From 2013 to 2016 Jüri Käo was the president of the Estonian Employers Confederation council, from 2004 to 2013 he was the vice president of the said council. Before that, from 1997 to 2002 he was the chairman of the board and in 2002–2004 vice chairman of the board.

In 1997–2002 and 2007–2014 Jüri Käo was the chairman of the Eesti Energia AS council.

Education 
 1972–1983 Tallinn School No. 21
 1983–1988 Leningrad Transportation Institute, Mechanical Engineer

Professional experience
1988-1990 Manufacturing community Norma, energetics specialist in the galvanics department
1990–1991 Collective enterprise Norma, department manager
1991–1992 Collective enterprise Norma, development director
1992–1994 Collective enterprise Norma, director general
1994–1996 Norma AS, director general/chairman of the board
1996–1999 Norma AS, chairman of the council
Since 1994 NG Investeeringud OÜ, chairman of the board
Since 2002 NG Kapital OÜ, chairman of the board
Since 2000 OÜ Gotfried, member of the board

Entrepreneurship 
Since 1995 Balbiino AS, member of the council
Since 1997 Tallinna Kaubamaja Group AS, chairman of the council
Since 1997 Kitman Thulema AS, chairman of the council
Since 1999 Tallinna Kaubamaja Kinnisvara AS, member of the council
Since 2000-2007 Baltic Rail Services OÜ, member of the council
Since 2000 Selver AS, member of the council
Since 2000 Liviko AS, member of the council
Since 2000 Roseni Majad OÜ, member of the board
Since 2004 Tartu Kaubamaja Kinnisvara OÜ, member of the council
Since 2005 Roseni Kinnisvara OÜ, member of the council
Since 2007 KIA Auto AS, member of the council
Since 2012 AS Viking Motors, member of the council
Since 2012 TKM Auto OÜ, member of the council
Since 2012 Kaubamaja AS, chairman of the council
Since 2013 TKM King AS, chairman of the council (2009-2013 ABC King AS, chairman of the council)
Since 2014 Viking Security AS, chairman of the council
Since 2015 TKM Beauty OÜ. member of the chairman
2000-2007 Baltic Rail Services OÜ, member of the chairman
2001-2007 Estonian Railways Ltd, member of the chairman
1997-2002 Eesti Energia AS, chairman of the council
2007-2014 Eesti Energia, chairman of the council

Membership in organisations and associations
1995-2015 Estonian Chamber of Commerce and Industry, vice chairman of the board
1997–2002 The Estonian Employers' Confederation, chairman of the board
2002–2004 The Estonian Employers' Confederation, vice chairman of the board
2004–2013 The Estonian Employers' Confederation, vice president of the council
2013-2016 The Estonian Employers Confederation, president of the council
Since 2016 The Estonian Employers' Confederation, vice president of the council

Participation in non-profit and social organisations
Since 1997 Estonian Business Association, member
1993–2012 Estonian Autosport Union, member of the board
Since 2000 Tallinn Yacht Club, vice commodore
2004–2012 Estonian Yachting Union, president
2012-2016 Estonian Yachting Union, member of the board
2008-2016 Estonian Olympic Committee, member of executive committee

Recognitions
2001 Order of the White Star, 4th class
2006 Order of the White Star, 2nd class

Interests
Sailing
Hunting
Motor sports

References

External links 
 NG Investeeringud
 Estonian Business Association members

Estonian businesspeople
1965 births
People from Tallinn
Living people
Recipients of the Order of the White Star, 2nd Class
Recipients of the Order of the White Star, 4th Class